Wolfgang Stark (born 20 November 1969) is a German former football referee who is based in Ergolding. He refereed for DJK Altdorf of the Bavarian Football Association.

Refereeing career
In addition to German domestic competitions, Stark officiated numerous matches in the UEFA Champions League and UEFA Europa League. He was also selected as referee for various international tournaments, including 2008 Olympics, 2010 FIFA World Cup, and UEFA Euro 2012.

In 2007, he refereed five matches at the 2007 FIFA U-20 World Cup, including the semi-final between Chile and Argentina. The match finished as a 3–0 win for Argentina with Stark issuing seven yellow cards (out of nine) and two red cards against Chile. Following the match, the Chilean players were restrained by members of the Toronto Police when they approached to meet fans outside the arena, as the police misunderstood the players' original intentions. The misunderstanding led the police to aggressively restrain Chilean players who defended fiercely, causing the use of electricity and pepper gas by the police. Some players were detained for several hours before being released. Stark left the stadium under escort, although he was not involved in the clash.

Stark retired from officiating in 2017 because he reached the age limit for German referees, which is 47. His final Bundesliga match officiated was between Borussia Mönchengladbach and Darmstadt 98.

2010 FIFA World Cup

Personal life
Stark lives in Ergolding, is married, and has one child.

References

External links
 Profile at dfb.de 
 Profile at worldfootball.net

1969 births
Living people
German football referees
2010 FIFA World Cup referees
UEFA Euro 2012 referees
FIFA World Cup referees
UEFA Europa League referees